IBTE Business Campus, formerly known as Business School, is a campus of the Institute of Brunei Technical Education (IBTE), a post-secondary vocational institution in Brunei. It is located in Gadong 'B', Brunei-Muara District. The institution offers vocational courses in the fields of business.

History 
IBTE Business Campus became operational on 1 February 2005 with the name  (Business School) as an independent government technical college, overseen by the then Department of Technical Education under the Ministry of Education. In 2014, it was subsumed under, and made a campus of, the umbrella institution which effectively replaced the department. The campus acquired its present name two years later.

Academics 
The Business Campus houses one of IBTE's schools, which is the School of Business. The schools offer programmes in the fields of business, leading up to Diploma, Higher National Technical Education Certificate (HNTec) and National Technical Education Certificate (NTec).

References

External links
 Institute of Brunei Technical Education

Sultan Bolkiah Campus
Educational institutions established in 2005
2005 establishments in Brunei